Rosalind Magee Peychaud (born 1948) is a Democratic former state representative for Louisiana House of Representatives District 91 (which she represented from 2002 to 2004).  In 2009 Peychaud became deputy chief of staff for U.S. Representative Joseph Cao, a Republican who represented Louisiana's 2nd congressional district. She served in his New Orleans district office.

Background
Peychaud was born Rosalind Magee in Monticello, Mississippi, in 1948. Her father was James H. Magee Sr. (died 2002 September 18), a deacon in Monticello's Oak Grove Missionary Baptist Church. Her mother was Marion Magee. Rosalind Magee Peychaud has two sisters (Catherine Magee Thompson and Regina Magee Hudson) and a brother (James H. Magee Jr.). Peychaud holds a B.A. degree in educational psychology from Jackson State University and a master's degree in social work from Tulane University.

NDF and other involvements
Peychaud is also the executive director of the New Orleans Neighborhood Development Foundation (NDF), in which role she has also been involved in the Affordable Housing Advisory Authority of the Federal Home Loan Bank of Dallas. She is a member of the New Orleans City Planning Commission, the Neighborhood Conservation District Committee (NCDC) of the City of New Orleans, and the Crescent City Connection Oversight Authority (CCCOA). NDF was established in 1986 and also had offices in Jackson, Mississippi. A distinct focus of NDF in New Orleans is the area now known as the Hoffman Triangle. On 2009 June 20 when NCDC made a decision with respect to two houses owned by Cao, Peychaud for ethical reasons recused herself from the vote.

Hoffman Triangle
 
Peychaud coined the term "Hoffman Triangle" during her service in the Louisiana House of Representatives. She based the term on the name of the John W. Hoffman Elementary School at the corner of South Prieur Street and Third Street, within the Hoffman Triangle. The Hoffman Triangle was, in Peychaud's own words, an area of intense "trash, drugs, and blight" in the inner city of New Orleans. Conditions there naturally worsened during and after Hurricane Katrina in 2005. Conditions in the Hoffman Triangle continued to concern Peychaud when she served on 2008 March 7–8 as a panelist for the Third National Summit on Equitable Development, Social Justice, and Smart Growth.

BOLD political organization
Peychaud is identified with the reform faction of the Orleans Parish Democratic Party and repeatedly opposed William J. Jefferson and the Progressive Democrats. In a district which had been represented by Jefferson protégée Renée Gill Pratt, Peychaud won the seat over Jalila Jefferson-Bullock (one of William J. Jefferson's daughters) in a special election on 2002 May 4 and subsequently lost it to her in the general election of 2003 November 15. Peychaud supported Karen Carter Peterson against William J. Jefferson in the 2006 Democratic primary election for Louisiana's 2nd congressional district. When Jefferson won the Democratic primary again in 2008, Peychaud joined with a number of other prominent Democrats in supporting Republican Cao, who ousted Jefferson in the 2008 general election. Longstanding antagonism has characterized the relationship between the Jeffersons and Peychaud—a situation which has repeatedly aligned Peychaud not only with Karen Carter Peterson but also with James Carter (no relation to Karen Carter Peterson), Jacquelyn Brechtel Clarkson, Cheryl A. Gray Evans, Stacy Head, and Helena Moreno. See BOLD.

Personal life
Rosalind Magee Peychaud is married to Joseph Ernest Peychaud, a descendant of Antoine Amédée Peychaud, originator of Peychaud's Bitters. Rosalind Peychaud, a Baptist, is a virtual teetotaler.

References

1948 births
African-American state legislators in Louisiana
African-American women in politics
Baptists from Texas
American community activists
Jackson State University alumni
Living people
Democratic Party members of the Louisiana House of Representatives
Politicians from Jackson, Mississippi
People from Monticello, Mississippi
People from Tyler, Texas
Politicians from New Orleans
Southeastern Louisiana University
Tulane University alumni
Women state legislators in Louisiana
Baptists from Mississippi
Baptists from Louisiana
21st-century African-American people
21st-century African-American women
20th-century African-American people
20th-century African-American women